Travancore Cochin Chemicals (TCC) is a public sector undertaking owned by the Government of Kerala, engaged in the manufacture and marketing of Caustic soda (NaOH), chlorine, Hydrochloric acid and sodium chlorate. It is situated in Udyogamandal industrial district of Kochi, India.The TCC exports caustic soda to African countries. 

The Travancore Cochin Chemicals recorded a profit of ₹32 crore in 2018 up from ₹6 Crore in 2017.

History
The TCC was founded in 1949 as a partnership between Mettur Chemical & Industrial Corporation Limited and FACT. It was later acquired by the Travancore Cochin government. In 1960, it became under the Kerala government.

References

External links
 Official website- https://www.tcckerala.com

Government-owned companies of Kerala
Companies based in Kochi
Indian companies established in 1949
Chemical companies established in 1949